A nipple shield is a piece of body jewelry worn on the nipple, partially or fully covering the areola.  The shield encircles the nipple, and can be attached by several means, including suction, friction and the action of glue, but is most often held in place by a nipple piercing. Usually, its primary intent is to lift, highlight, and ornament the nipple, as well as the whole breast, much as other pieces of jewelry do for other parts of the body. 

Nipple shield jewellery is available in a wide variety of decorative designs. A shield, particularly the type known as a breast petal, can also be worn to smooth the transition between nipple and breast, so as to disguise the protuberant feature and present a smoother clothed profile.  As a breast petal is designed to be unobtrusive, and covers both the nipple itself and the surrounding areola, it is better considered a type of pasty, an adhesive patch designed to do this. 

When the singer Janet Jackson performed on live television in 2004 during that year's Super Bowl one of her breasts became briefly visible, showing that she was wearing a nipple shield. The event became referred to as a "wardrobe malfunction" and resulted in the Super Bowl XXXVIII halftime show controversy.

See also
 Genital jewellery
 Nipple stimulation

References

Body piercing jewellery
Shield (jewelry)